Alajuela is a canton in the Alajuela province of Costa Rica.  Its head city is the provincial capital city of Alajuela.

History 
Alajuela was created on 7 December 1848 by decree 167.

Geography 
Alajuela has an area of  km² and a mean elevation of  metres.

Northward from the city of Alajuela, the canton continues along the border with the province of Heredia to its east, encompassing a strip of the Cordillera Central (Central Mountain Range) between Poas Volcano and Barva Volcano. On the Caribbean side of the mountains, the canton takes in a portion of the Sarapiquí area. The Río Poás (Poas River) forms the major portion of the canton's western border, finally giving way to the Río Poasito as the territory ascends into the Cordillera Central.

Southwest of the city of Alajuela, the canton of Alajuela ends at the confluence of the Río Grande (Great River) and the Río Virilla (Virilla River).

Landmarks

In the center of Alajuela, next to Parque de Alajuela, also known as "Parque de los Mangos", is Alajuela Cathedral, whose main feature is its red dome. This park is a popular place for locals to socialize, especially in the afternoons. One block west of the park is the Mercado Central de Alajuela, a bustling shopping centre.

To the north of the Central Park is the Museo Histórico Cultural Juan Santamaría. This museum, situated in a building built in 1894-45, which was formerly a prison in the barracks of Alajuela, contains many historical maps, artifacts and portraits of the 1856-1857 campaign. In 1977 it became the headquarters of the Centro de Investigación para el Perfeccionamiento Técnico (CIPET), an institution of the Ministry of Public Education.

Districts 
The canton of Alajuela is subdivided into the following districts:
 Alajuela
 San José
 Carrizal
 San Antonio
 Guácima
 San Isidro
 Sabanilla
 San Rafael
 Río Segundo
 Desamparados
 Turrúcares
 Tambor
 Garita
 Sarapiquí

Demographics 

For the 2011 census, Alajuela had a population of  inhabitants.

Transportation

Road transportation 
The canton is covered by the following road routes:

Rail transportation 
The Interurbano Line operated by Incofer goes through this canton.

Economy 
It is a major area for the production of coffee, strawberries and ornamental plants. The Doka Estate lies within the canton, in Sabanilla District, and is a major coffee producing estate, supplying directly to Starbucks.

References 

Cantons of Alajuela Province
Populated places in Alajuela Province